Thirumurugan Veeran (born on 9 January 1983), also known as V. Thirumurugan, is a Malaysian retired footballer. He also a member of the Malaysia national football team.

He made his national début at the 2005 Manila Sea Games, which Malaysia won the bronze medal in the football event. He then made his senior debut against New Zealand on 19 February 2006.

He previously played for Perak, but was not retained. This paved the way for him to rejoined his home team, Kedah. He was an instrumental figure in helping Kedah won the 'double treble' championship (League, FA Cup and Malaysia Cup) in 2007 and 2008. He played with Kedah for six seasons, before returning to Perak for the 2013 season.

For the 2014 season, he joined PDRM FA. Two years later, he joined Perlis FA.

Honours

Kedah FA
 Malaysia Cup (2) : 2007, 2008
 Malaysia FA Cup (2) : 2007, 2008
 Malaysia Super League (2) : 2007, 2008

References

External links
 Player profile – doha-2006.com
 
 Defender vows to help Malaysia into final

1983 births
Living people
Malaysian people of Tamil descent
Malaysian sportspeople of Indian descent
Malaysian footballers
Kedah Darul Aman F.C. players
Perak F.C. players
Perlis FA players
PDRM FA players
Malaysia international footballers
Tamil sportspeople
Malaysian Hindus
2007 AFC Asian Cup players
People from Kedah
Malaysia Super League players
Association football defenders
Footballers at the 2006 Asian Games
Asian Games competitors for Malaysia